Zion Mansour Ozeri (born 1951) is an Israeli-American photographer known for his photographs documenting Jewish experience and the Jewish Diaspora. Born in Israel to immigrants from Yemen, Ozeri currently lives in New York City.

Early life and education 
Ozeri was raised in Israel in the 1950s during a period of mass immigration. He moved to New York City to study at the Fashion Institute of Technology. He then went on to complete his BFA at Pratt Institute.

Career 
Ozeri's photographs have appeared in numerous publications, including the New York Times, Newsweek, The Jerusalem Report, Moment, The Middle East Insight, and The Economist, and have been exhibited in museums and galleries in the United States and internationally. His published books include The Jewish World Family Haggadah (Simon & Schuster, 2005) and Jews of Yemen, The Last Generation (Keter, 2005). In 2004 Ozeri received the Simon Rockower Award for Excellence in Jewish Journalism. He was a recipient of the 2013 Covenant Award.

The Jewish Lens

In 2004 Ozeri founded The Jewish Lens, a curriculum for middle- and high-school students that teaches Jewish traditions and values through photography.

DiverCity Lens

In 2010 Ozeri created DiverCity Lens. The program encourages students to explore identity and community, and also teaches skills in photography and visual literacy. As of 2020, the DiverCity Lens curriculum is implemented in over 20 New York City public schools.

Publications 
Books

 The Jewish World Family Haggadah. New York: Simon & Schuster, 2012. .
 The Jews of Yemen, The Last Generation. Jerusalem: Keter, Jerusalem, 2005. .
Operation Exodus: The making of a miracle. New York: UJA Federation, 1995. .
Yemenite Jews: A Photographic Essay. New York: Schocken, 1985. .

References 

1951 births
Living people
Israeli photographers
Israeli emigrants to the United States
Pratt Institute alumni
Jewish American artists
Israeli people of Yemeni-Jewish descent
Jewish Israeli artists
Fashion Institute of Technology alumni